A beach is a geological formation consisting of loose rock particles along the shoreline of a body of water.

Beach, BEACH, Beaches or beaching may also refer to:

Geography

Canada
 Beaches (electoral district), a federal electoral district in Toronto, Ontario
 Beaches (provincial electoral district), a provincial riding in Toronto, Ontario
 Beaches, Newfoundland and Labrador, a village
 The Beaches, a neighbourhood of Toronto, Canada

United States
 Beach, Georgia, an unincorporated community
 Beach, Missouri, an unincorporated community
 Beach, North Dakota, a town
 Beach, Washington, an unincorporated community
 Jacksonville Beaches, or Beaches, a neighborhood of Jacksonville, Florida

Other places
 Beach, Gloucestershire, a village in England
 Kingdom of Beach, a promontory of Terra Australis appearing on Latin maps of the 16th century
 List of beaches, of the world, sorted by country

Arts, entertainment, and media

Books
 Beaches (novel), a 1986 novel by Iris Rainer Dart
 The Beach (novel), a 1996 novel by Alex Garland
 Sebastian Beach, Lord Emsworth's butler in the stories of P. G. Wodehouse

Films
 Beaches (1988 film), starring Bette Midler and Barbara Hershey
 Beaches (2017 film), a television remake of the 1988 film, starring Idina Menzel and Nia Long
 The Beach (film), a 2000 film starring Leonardo DiCaprio

Music
 Beach music, a music genre of the 1950s and 1960s
 The Beaches (band), Canadian rock band 
 Beaches (soundtrack), the soundtrack to the 1988 film
 Beach (song), a song by San Cisco

People
 Adam Beach (born 1972), Canadian actor
 Alfred Ely Beach (1826–1896), inventor and publisher
 Allen C. Beach (1825–1918), New York politician
 Amy Beach (1867–1944), American composer, also known as Mrs. H.H.A. Beach 
 Bill Beach (jazz musician) (born 1953), American jazz musician
 Bill Beach (rockabilly musician) (born 1932), American musician
 Bill Beach (rower) (1850–1935), Australian sculler
 Carmi W. Beach (1841–1888), American politician in Wisconsin
 Charles L. Beach (1866–1933), president of the University of Connecticut
 David Nelson Beach (1848–1926), American theologian
 Edward L. Beach Jr. (1918–2002), U.S. Navy submarine commander and author
 Fred Beach (1897–1981), NFL footballer with Los Angeles Buccaneers
 George Beach (politician) (1817–?), New York politician
 George Beach (born 1926), Canadian-born ice hockey player
 Harlan Page Beach (1854–1933), American missionary, brother of David Nelson Beach
 Jessie G. Beach (1887–1954), American paleontologist and museum aide
 John Robert Beach (1871-1954), American farmer and politician
 Michael Beach (born 1963), American actor
 Moses Yale Beach (1800–1868), American inventor and publisher
 Nelson J. Beach (1800–1876), New York politician
 Ralph H. Beach, co-inventor of the Edison-Beach railcar
 Rex Beach (1877–1949), American author
 Steven Beach (born 1956), American psychologist
 Sylvia Beach (1887–1962), editor and bookseller
 Walter Beach (born 1933), American football player
 William Beach (disambiguation), several people:
 William Beach (1783–1856), British politician
 William Beach (American politician) ( 1815–1860), American politician
 William Beach (economist), commissioner of U.S. Bureau of Labor Statistics
 William Dorrance Beach (1856–1932), American army officer
 William Henry Beach (1871–1952), British Army officer
 Zenas Beach (1825–1898), Wisconsin politician

Other uses
 Beaching (nautical), to lay a vessel ashore or ground it deliberately
 Bettering the Evaluation and Care of Health (BEACH), an Australian Department of Health system for collecting data from general practice
 Cetacean stranding, when a whale beaches itself
 Wader, also known as beach bird

See also
 Beech (disambiguation)
 On the Beach (disambiguation)
 The Beach (disambiguation)
 The Beach Boys (disambiguation)
 

English-language surnames